Edythe M. "Delilah" Lewis (February 26, 1924 – June 5, 2014) was the first black, female disc jockey in Dayton, Ohio, United States, in the 1950s.

Early life and education 
Lewis was born Edythe Mulzac, raised in Harlem and trained as a nurse at Harlem Hospital in New York. Later, she earned her bachelor's degree in Education from the University of Cincinnati and then two master's degrees.

Career 
Lewis was the first black woman to host a radio show in Dayton, Ohio, broadcasting on WING-AM as Delilah in the 1950s. She was inducted into the Dayton Area Broadcasters Hall of Fame in 2003. The Dayton Daily News called her a pioneer and said she was a role model during a period when there were very few black people in the broadcasting industry.

In 1971, she was hired by the Miami Conservancy District. She later became the District's executive director. In 1976, Governor James A. Rhodes appointed her to the Ohio Recreation and Resources Commission. In 1979 she was named one of Dayton's Top 10 Women by the Dayton Daily News. Lewis retired from the District in the early 1980s.

She served on the boards of Wright State University and the Children's Medical Center, among others.

In 2001, her husband Lloyd E. Lewis Jr., a member of the Dayton City Commission, died, and she was elected in a special election to fill out the remaining months of his term, defeating Republican Abner Orick.

Personal life 
Lewis died on June 5, 2014 from complications from Alzheimer's disease.

Recognition
 1979: Top 10 Women
 2003: Dayton Broadcasting Hall of Fame

References

1924 births
2014 deaths
People from Dayton, Ohio
American radio personalities
African-American radio personalities
Dayton City Council members
21st-century American women politicians
21st-century American politicians
African-American women in politics
African-American people in Ohio politics
People from Harlem
University of Cincinnati alumni
Wright State University alumni
Central Michigan University alumni
Women DJs
African-American DJs
Neurological disease deaths in the United States
Deaths from Alzheimer's disease
African-American women musicians
21st-century African-American women
21st-century African-American politicians
20th-century African-American people
20th-century African-American women